Priyanka Khedkar (born ) is a retired Indian female volleyball player. She was part of the India women's national volleyball team.

She participated at the 2010 Asian Games, and 2014 Asian Games. 
On club level she played for Indian Railways in 2010.

References

1984 births
Living people
Indian women's volleyball players
Volleyball players at the 2010 Asian Games
Place of birth missing (living people)
Volleyball players at the 2014 Asian Games
21st-century Indian women
21st-century Indian people
Asian Games competitors for India
Volleyball players at the 2018 Asian Games
Sportspeople from Nagpur
Volleyball players from Maharashtra